Hockey at the 1980 Olympics may refer to:

Ice hockey at the 1980 Winter Olympics
Field hockey at the 1980 Summer Olympics